Calzada Larga Airport is a general aviation airport serving Caimitillo, a town in  the Panamá Province of Panama.

History
During World War II the facility was used as part of the defense of the Panama Canal. The USAAF XXVI Fighter Command 29th Fighter Squadron used the airfield from 17 May 1942 – 25 March 1944, flying A-24 Dauntless dive bombers. The squadron flew antisubmarine patrols from the field. In addition various Air Commando units from Albrook Field used the airfield flying training missions with CG-4A Waco gliders and P-51 Mustangs.

See also
Transport in Panama
List of airports in Panama

References

External links

OpenStreetMap - Calzada Larga Airport
OurAirports - Calzada Larga
FallingRain - Calzada Larga

Airfields of the United States Army Air Forces in Panama
Airports in Panama